Alexis Hall is an English author of urban fantasy, science fiction, and m/m romance. His novels include For Real, Glitterland, Iron & Velvet, Looking for Group, and Pansies.

His work has been nominated for the 26th Lambda Literary Awards, 28th Lambda Literary Awards, and 29th Lambda Literary Awards in the category of Gay Romance.

Career
Alexis Hall has held a variety of jobs, "including ice cream maker, fortune teller, lab technician, and professional gambler." A published author since 2013, he had four newly released romance books in 2022.

Bibliography
Winner Bakes All

 Rosaline Palmer Takes the Cake (2021)
 Paris Daillencourt is About to Crumble (2022)

London Calling

 Boyfriend Material (2020)
 Husband Material (2022)
 10 Things That Never Happened (Coming 2023)
 Father Material (Coming 2024)
 London Calling #5 (announced)

Arden St. Ives series How to Bang a Billionaire (2017)
 How to Blow It with a Billionaire (2017)
How to Belong with a Billionaire (2019)

 Spires series 

 Glitterland (Glitterland, #1) (2013)
 Aftermath (Glitterland, #1.5) (2013)
 Waiting for the Flood (2015)
 For Real (2015)
 In Vino (2016)
 Pansies (2016)
 Rough Ride (announced)
 Fool's Gold (announced)Something Fabulous

 Something Fabulous (2022)
 Something Spectacular (Coming 2023)

A Lady for a Duke

 A Lady for a Duke (2022)
 Bea & Amberglass (announced)

Kate Kane, Paranormal Investigator 

 Iron & Velvet (2013)
 Shadows & Dreams (2014)
 Fire & Water (2020)
 Smoke & Ashes (2020)
 Time & Tide (announced)

Prosperityverse 

 Prosperity (2014)
 There Will Be Phlogiston (2014)
 Liberty and Other Stories (2015)
 Shackles
 Squamous with a Chance of Rain
 Cloudy Climes and Starless Skies
 Liberty

Standalone works

 Looking for Group (2016)
 The Affair of the Mysterious Letter (2019)
 Murder Most Actual (2021)

& Other Monsters anthology 

 Sand and Ruin and Gold (2014)
 Draconitas - A Ruin Story (2016)
 Wintergreen
 My Last Husband
 Glass

References 

21st-century English novelists
Queer novelists
English LGBT novelists
Year of birth missing (living people)
Living people
21st-century LGBT people